In the fictional Marvel Comics multiverse, Earth-616 is the primary continuity in which most Marvel Comics titles take place.

Origins of the term 
The designation "Earth-616" has its origins in Captain Britain comics from the early 1980s and can be attributed to both Dave Thorpe and Alan Moore. The term was first used in "Rough Justice", a story credited to both Alan Moore and Alan Davis published in July 1983 by Marvel UK in the seventh issue of the anthology comic The Daredevils (and was later reprinted in the Captain Britain trade paperback). Due to this, it is often credited to Moore, though Davis said in 2007 that the term had been internally established earlier by Thorpe, who was the previous writer for Captain Britain, as part of the "Captain Britain folklore". He said that it came from a variation on the number of the beast, picked because Thorpe "wasn't a fan of the modern superhero genre" and expressed this in his stories, "such as recording his opinion of the Marvel Universe with the designation 616." 

In a 2019 interview with Rich Johnston, Thorpe confirmed that the number was derived from subtracting 50 from 666, but that the reference to the number of the beast was due to the fact that the designation was intended for the "Crooked World" of the Jaspers' Warp storyline.

After its use in The Daredevils, the designation was later used by the American branch of Marvel Comics in the Excalibur title, which frequently referenced Captain Britain's early UK-published adventures. This comic was written by Chris Claremont, who had created Captain Britain, and pencilled by Alan Davis, the artist on the UK-published series. Davis later had a run as both writer and artist on the book.

References to Earth-616 
Most references to Earth-616 appear in Marvel UK titles, in Excalibur, or in Marvel reference texts such as the guide to Alternate Universes (2005). In addition, there are a number of other references to Earth-616:

 In Marvel 1602 #6 (March 2004), Uatu the Watcher refers to the universe as Earth-616.
 In Marvel Knights 4 #15 (April 2005), Earth-616 is mentioned.
 In Uncanny X-Men #462 (September 2005), an alteration in reality of Earth-616 causes trans-temporal devastation, and Saturnyne attempts to destroy that particular temporal continuity to "cauterize the wound".
 In Iron Man: Fatal Frontier #10, Doctor Doom mentions that they are in either Earth-616 or in Earth-615.
 In all the issues of Deadpool Kills Deadpool (July 2013), the story centers around the timeline of the Earth-616 Deadpool rather that any of the alternate universe versions.
 In Secret Wars (2015) #1, the universe where the main story line takes place is referred to as Earth-616. 

The term has also appeared in Exiles (in, among others, the House of M tie-in issues) and is in regular use by the writers of Marvel's Official Handbooks for the simplicity of the term. 

There has been at least one attempt within Marvel canon to change the designation of Earth-616. In the final story arc of X-Man (issues #71–74), writer Steven Grant began to refer to the planet as "Earth-611" due to the destruction of several other Earths (which were all apparently "higher on the list" of the Multiverse than the Marvel Earth) by a godlike entity. This change, an allusion to the events of DC's Crisis on Infinite Earths, was not adopted by other writers.

In other media

Marvel Cinematic Universe 

 In the film Thor: The Dark World (2013), Erik Selvig is portrayed as being somewhat mentally unstable and in his time at a mental hospital he draws a number of diagrams and equations on a blackboard. Near the center of all of this, the words "616 universe" can be seen underlined.
 In the second season of Iron Fist (2018), Misty Knight is driving with Colleen Wing when they hear a police radio broadcast alerting all units to "multiple fatalities at a nearby nightclub" and a "code 616". Misty explains that 616 is the police code for a "possible suspect with abilities".
 In the film Avengers: Endgame (2019), Ant-Man's van was being held in a storage area labeled "616".
 In the film Spider-Man: Far From Home (2019), Mysterio claims that the main Marvel Cinematic Universe continuity exists on "Earth-616". However, the MCU was previously designated as Earth-199999 in the 2008 coffee table book Official Handbook of the Marvel Universe A to Z, Vol. 5 and is referred to as such in other media. It is left unclear if this is a misdirect by Mysterio.
 In the film Doctor Strange in the Multiverse of Madness (2022), Christine Palmer of Earth-838 informs Doctor Strange that his universe is "Earth-616".

Other films 
 In the film Spider-Man: Into the Spider-Verse, Earth-616 is seen in a monitor along with other Earths, while Peter B. Parker arrives on Earth-1610 (the Ultimate Marvel Universe) when the interdimensional machine starts malfunctioning.

Editorial reaction 
Former Marvel Editor in Chief Joe Quesada and Executive Editor Tom Brevoort have each stated their dislike for the term Earth-616.

References

External links 
 
 Earth-616 at Spider-Man Wiki

Fictional elements introduced in 1939
Marvel Comics dimensions
Fictional dimensions
Fictional universes
Fiction about Earth